The Alvarez hypothesis posits that the mass extinction of the non-avian dinosaurs and many other living things during the Cretaceous–Paleogene extinction event was caused by the impact of a large asteroid on the Earth. Prior to 2013, it was commonly cited as having happened about 65 million years ago, but Renne and colleagues (2013) gave an updated value of 66 million years. Evidence indicates that the asteroid fell in the Yucatán Peninsula, at Chicxulub, Mexico. The hypothesis is named after the father-and-son team of scientists Luis and Walter Alvarez, who first suggested it in 1980. Shortly afterwards, and independently, the same was suggested by Dutch paleontologist Jan Smit.

In March 2010, an international panel of scientists endorsed the asteroid hypothesis, specifically the Chicxulub impact, as being the cause of the extinction. A team of 41 scientists reviewed 20 years of scientific literature and in so doing also ruled out other theories such as massive volcanism. They had determined that a space rock  in diameter hurtled into earth at Chicxulub.

A 2016 drilling project into the peak ring of the crater strongly supported the hypothesis, and confirmed various matters that had been unclear until that point. These included the fact that the peak ring comprised granite (a rock found deep within the earth) rather than typical sea floor rock, which had been shocked, melted, and ejected to the surface in minutes, and evidence of colossal seawater movement directly afterwards from sand deposits. Crucially, the cores also showed a near complete absence of gypsum, a sulfate-containing rock, which would have been vaporized and dispersed as an aerosol into the atmosphere, confirming the presence of a probable link between the impact and global longer-term effects on the climate and food chain.

History

In 1980, a team of researchers led by Nobel prize-winning physicist Luis Alvarez, his son, geologist Walter Alvarez, and chemists Frank Asaro and Helen Vaughn Michel discovered that sedimentary layers found all over the world at the Cretaceous–Paleogene boundary (K–Pg boundary, formerly called Cretaceous–Tertiary or K–T boundary) contain a concentration of iridium hundreds of times greater than normal.

Previously, in a 1953 publication, geologists Allan O. Kelly and Frank Dachille analyzed global geological evidence suggesting that one or more giant asteroids impacted the Earth, causing an angular shift in its axis, global floods, firestorms, atmospheric occlusion, and the extinction of the dinosaurs. There were other earlier speculations on the possibility of an impact event, but without strong confirming evidence.

Evidence
The location of the impact was unknown when the Alvarez team developed their hypothesis, but later scientists discovered the Chicxulub Crater in the Yucatán Peninsula, now considered the likely impact site.

Paul Renne of the Berkeley Geochronology Center has reported that the date of the asteroid event is 66,038,000 years ago, plus or minus 11,000 years, based on Ar-Ar dating.  He further posits that the mass extinction of dinosaurs occurred within 33,000 years of this date.

In April 2019, a paper was published in PNAS which describes evidence from a fossil site in North Dakota that the authors say provides a "postimpact snapshot" of events after the asteroid collision "including ejecta accretion and faunal mass death". The team found that the tektites that had peppered the area were present in amber found on the site and were also embedded in the gills of about 50 percent of the fossil fish. They were also able to find traces of iridium. The authors – who include Walter Alvarez – postulate that shock of the impact, equivalent to an earthquake of magnitude 10 or 11, may have led to seiches, oscillating movements of water in lakes, bays, or gulfs, that would have reached the site in North Dakota within minutes or hours of the impact. This would have led to the rapid burial of organisms under a thick layer of sediment. Coauthor David Burnham of the University of Kansas was quoted as saying "They’re not crushed, it’s like an avalanche that collapses almost like a liquid, then sets like concrete. They were killed pretty suddenly because of the violence of that water. We have one fish that hit a tree and was broken in half."

According to a high-resolution study of fossilized fish bones published in 2022, the Cretaceous-Paleogene mass extinction happened during the Northern Hemisphere spring.

Criticism
A leading critic of the Alvarez hypothesis is Gerta Keller, who has focused on Deccan Traps volcanism as a likely cause of a more gradual extinction.

2016 Chicxulub crater drilling project

In 2016, a scientific drilling project drilled deep into the peak ring of the Chicxulub impact crater, to obtain rock core samples from the impact itself. The discoveries were widely seen as confirming current theories related to both the crater impact, and its effects. They confirmed that the rock composing the peak ring had been subjected to immense pressures and forces and had been melted by immense heat and shocked by immense pressure from its usual state into its present form in just minutes; the fact that the peak ring was made of granite was also significant, since granite is not a rock found in sea-floor deposits, it originates much deeper in the earth and had been ejected to the surface by the immense pressures of impact; that gypsum, a sulfate-containing rock that is usually present in the shallow seabed of the region, had been almost entirely removed and must therefore have been almost entirely vaporized and entered the atmosphere, and that the event was immediately followed by a huge megatsunami (a massive movement of sea waters) sufficient to lay down the largest known layer of sand separated by grain size directly above the peak ring.

These strongly support the hypothesis that the impactor was large enough to create a 120-mile peak ring, to melt, shock and eject basement granite from the mid-crust deep within the earth, to create colossal water movements, and to eject an immense quantity of vaporized rock and sulfates into the atmosphere, where they would have persisted for a long time.  This global dispersal of dust and sulfates would have led to a sudden and catastrophic effect on the climate worldwide, large temperature drops, and devastated the food chain.

References

Hypotheses
Hypothetical impact events
Cretaceous–Paleogene boundary
1980s in science